Burak Beydili (born May 2, 1990) is an archer from Turkey.

References

1990 births
Living people
Turkish male archers
21st-century Turkish people